Deer Park Airport , formerly known as Deer Park Municipal Airport, is a city-owned public-use airport located three nautical miles (6 km) northeast of the central business district of Deer Park, a city in Spokane County, Washington, United States.

Although most U.S. airports use the same three-letter location identifier for the FAA and IATA, this airport is assigned DEW by the FAA but has no designation from the IATA.

Facilities and aircraft 
It has two asphalt paved runways: 16/34 is 6,100 by 75 feet (1,859 x 23 m) and 4/22 is 3,200 by 60 feet (975 x 18 m).

For the 12-month period ending December 31, 2005, the airport had 23,000 general aviation aircraft operations, an average of 63 per day: At that time there were 75 aircraft based at this airport: 84% single-engine, 3% multi-engine, 1% helicopter, 9% glider, 3% ultralight.

References

External links 
 Deer Park Municipal Airport (DEW) at Washington State DOT Aviation
 

Airports in Washington (state)
Transportation buildings and structures in Spokane County, Washington